State Trunk Highway 168 (often called Highway 168, STH-168 or WIS 168) was a state highway in the U.S. state of Wisconsin. Because it paralleled WIS 54 and WIS 156, the road was turned over to Outagamie County control in 2003, and is now designated as County Trunk Highway VV (CTH-VV).

Route description
At its latest routing, WIS 168 began its journey east from WIS 47 east of Nichols.

History
In 1934, WIS 168 was first established to travel along present-day CTH-A and 13th Avenue from US Highway 16 (US 16, now WIS 16) to the Quarry Hill Road/Cinder Avenue intersection. This intersection was located at Camp McCoy (now relocated and named Fort McCoy), a military base northeast of Sparta. During its existence, no significant changes were made. In 1959, the routing was removed.

In the mid-1980s, WIS 168 was re-established after an easternmost portion of WIS 156 (east of WIS 187) was moved northward. As a result, WIS 168 filled in the former alignment east of Leeman. It ran from WIS 187 in Leeman to WIS 55 near Nichols. In 1996, part of WIS 55 north of Seymour shifted eastward along former CTH-C. As a result, WIS 168 extended east along WIS 55's former alignment. Then, in 1998, the original portion of WIS 168 was removed in favor of turning this portion into a locally-controlled route (replaced by CTH-F). In 2003, WIS 168 was entirely removed in favor of CTH-VV. WIS 168 has not been used ever since.

Major intersections

See also

References

168
Transportation in Outagamie County, Wisconsin